Frank Ronald Tepedino (born November 23, 1947) is a former left-handed Major League Baseball player. He was born in Brooklyn, New York. He played for the New York Yankees (–), Milwaukee Brewers (1971) and Atlanta Braves (–) professional baseball teams in Major League Baseball during his career. Tepedino was inducted into the Suffolk Sports Hall of Fame in 2004.

Career 
Tepedino graduated from George W. Wingate High School in Brooklyn NY in 1965. He was drafted by the Baltimore Orioles on June 8, 1965, in the third round of the 1965 amateur draft. He was then drafted from the Orioles by the New York Yankees on November 28, 1966 in the 1966 first-year draft. 

Tepedino made his major league debut on May 12, 1967 with the Yankees in a game against Orioles at Yankee Stadium, with 22,300 in attendance. He pinch hit for Whitey Ford in the bottom of the third inning of a blowout, and popped out to shortstop. The Yankees lost the game by a score of 14–0.

Tepedino was traded along with Bobby Mitchell from the Yankees to the Brewers for Danny Walton on June 7, 1971. On March 31, 1972, he was repurchased by the Yankees from the Brewers, and on June 7, 1973, traded again, with Wayne Nordhagen and players to be named later, to the Atlanta Braves for Pat Dobson. To complete the trade, the Yankees also sent Dave Cheadle on August 15, 1973 and Al Closter on September 5, 1973 to the Braves.

Personal life 
After retiring from baseball, Tepedino served as a firefighter for the New York City Fire Department. Following the September 11 attacks, Tepedino drove to the World Trade Center site and participated in search and rescue operations. During an assembly at Rocky Point High School six years afterward, Tepedino said, "I lost 343 friends on September 11, 2001," referring to his fire department colleagues. "I didn't know them all personally, but they were all my friends." On October 11, 2001, one month after the attacks, Tepedino threw out the first pitch at the second game of the 2001 American League Division Series at Yankee Stadium.

Tepedino is a recovering alcoholic. He became addicted to alcohol at age 19 and as of 2011 had given speeches to an estimated 60,000 youngsters for the Long Island, New York based Winning for Winning, co-founded with former Yankee teammate Rusty Torres, which educates youth about the dangers of alcohol and drugs and promotes youth athletics.

References

External links 
Baseball-Reference
Baseball-Almanac
Baseball Library

Major League Baseball first basemen
New York Yankees players
Atlanta Braves players
Syracuse Chiefs players
1947 births
Living people
Sportspeople from Brooklyn
Baseball players from New York City